Kan Bahlam I, also known as Chan Bahlum I, (September 18, 524 – February 1, 583) was an ajaw of the Maya city-state of Palenque. He acceded to the throne on April 6, 572 at age 47 and ruled until his death. Kan Bahlam was most likely the younger brother of his predecessor, Ahkal Mo' Nahb II and probably son of K'an Joy Chitam I. He was the first ruler of Palenque to use the title K'inich, albeit inconsistently. The title is usually translated as "radiant" but literally means "sun-faced".

Notes

Sources 

Rulers of Palenque
583 deaths
6th-century monarchs in North America
524 births
6th century in the Maya civilization